Pennsylvania's 25th congressional district was one of Pennsylvania's districts of the United States House of Representatives.

Geography
In 1903 the district was drawn to cover Crawford and Erie counties, which had been its original area 60 years earlier.

The district was again moved in 1922. At this time it was redrawn to cover Washington and Greene counties.

In 1942 the boundaries of the district were redrawn without actually moving it for the first time. Greene County was transferred to the 24th District while parts of Allegheny County south and west of down-town Pittsburgh were moved to the 25th District. In 1944 the district boundaries were totally redrawn. It now consisted of Beaver, Butler and Lawrence counties. These boundaries were then redrawn in 1972, with a small strip of northern Allegheny County being put in the 25th district.

The district was eliminated in 1983.

Demographics
In 1902 the district was drawn to cover an area with a population of 162,116. Only 4 of Pennsylvania's 30 districts had fewer people at this point. Some Pennsylvania districts had over 250,000 people at this point. 0.4% of the population of what would be the 25th district in 1902 was black in 1900.

History
This district was created in 1833. In 1853, it consisted of Crawford County, Pennsylvania and Erie County, Pennsylvania at this point. The district had a population of 76,591.

It was eliminated in 1863. This district was recreated in 1873. The district was held at-large until 1875. In 1875 it was made a geographical district covering Forest County, Pennsylvania, Clarion County, Pennsylvania, Jefferson County, Pennsylvania, Armstrong County, Pennsylvania and Indiana County, Pennsylvania. It had a population of 131,663. In 1888 Pennsylvania congressional districts were redrawn because there was a decision to make Pennsylvania's 28th congressional district a geographical district and end its election at large. The 25th district was shifted to cover Butler County, Pennsylvania, Beaver County, Pennsylvania, Lawrence County, Pennsylvania and Mercer County, Pennsylvania. These would remain the boundaries until 1912.

The district was eliminated as a result of the redistricting cycle after the 1980 Census.

List of members representing the district

References

25
Former congressional districts of the United States
Constituencies established in 1833
1833 establishments in Pennsylvania
Constituencies disestablished in 1843
1843 disestablishments in Pennsylvania
Constituencies established in 1853
1853 establishments in Pennsylvania
Constituencies disestablished in 1863
1863 disestablishments in Pennsylvania
Constituencies established in 1875
1875 establishments in Pennsylvania
Constituencies disestablished in 1983
1983 disestablishments in Pennsylvania